Rao Jamil Akhtar was elected as Okara Tehsil nazim in 2005 unopposed. He was member Provincial Assembly of the Punjab with Rao Sikandar Iqbal. Then again contested in 2013 which he lost.

References

Living people
Pakistani politicians
Year of birth missing (living people)
Members of the Provincial Assembly of the Punjab
People from Okara, Pakistan